Otis James McDuffie (born December 2, 1969) is a former American college and professional football player who was a wide receiver in the National Football League (NFL) for eight seasons. He played college football for Penn State University, and earned All-American honors. A first-round pick in the 1993 NFL Draft, he played professionally for the NFL's Miami Dolphins.

Early years
McDuffie was born in Marion, Ohio. He attended Hawken School in Gates Mills, Ohio, excelling in football, basketball, track and field and baseball. He set Hawken's record for all-purpose yards with 7,302 in his high school career. In 1986, McDuffie returned an interception 108 yards, an unofficial Ohio state record. During his senior year in 1987, he was named the A-AA Ohio Player of the year. For the 1987 high school football season, he scored 136 points (21 touchdowns) ahead of future professional football players Desmond Howard and Robert Smith.

His number 32 is retired at Hawken School and The News-Herald named McDuffie the number 3 player of the 20th century in Northeast Ohio. Memorabilia from McDuffie's days playing Marion Midget Football are featured in an exhibit entitled "A Passion to Play" at the Marion County Historical Society.

College career
McDuffie attended Pennsylvania  State University, and played for coach Joe Paterno's Penn State Nittany Lions football team. He wore the number 24 for the Nittany Lions. He set several single-season and career receiving records, as well as all-purpose yards records. His performance in Penn State's 1992 Fiesta Bowl victory over Tennessee on January 1, 1992 garnered him the game's offensive MVP.

McDuffie also played one season of varsity baseball in 1990 while at Penn State. He still holds the PSU record for stolen bases in a single game with 4, and is in the top 10 for stolen bases in a single season. McDuffie was drafted by the then California Angels in the 41st round of the 1991 Major League Baseball Draft but did not sign.

He earned a Bachelor of Science degree in labor and industrial relations from Penn State in 1992.

Professional career
The Miami Dolphins selected McDuffie in the first round (25th pick overall) of the 1993 NFL Draft. He returned punts and was a reserve wide receiver before earning the starting spot for the Dolphins. During his formative years with the Dolphins, McDuffie became known as Dan Marino's favorite receiver. His 415 career catches are fourth all-time in Dolphins history. In 1998, McDuffie caught 90 passes, leading the NFL in that category. He was the first Dolphin to achieve this mark (since achieved by Jarvis Landry in 2017).  That same year, McDuffie became the first player in NFL history to record at least 90 receptions and 10 punt returns in a season without a fumble.  Antonio Brown of Pittsburgh in 2016 is the only player to do it since.  With the exception of Mark Clayton and Mark Duper, McDuffie caught more passes thrown by Marino than any other Dolphin receiver. He played his entire career in Miami, retiring in 2000 because of a nagging toe injury.

Nearly ten years later, McDuffie would win a Medical malpractice lawsuit related to that career-ending toe injury. On May 5, 2010, Miami-Dade County, Florida jurors ordered a former Dolphins team physician, Dr. John Uribe, to pay McDuffie $11.5 million in damages. The lawsuit alleged Uribe told McDuffie he was safe to continue playing football, despite MRIs showing damage to the tendons in his toe. On September 30, 2010, Judge Michael Genden of Miami-Dade County tossed out that verdict due to the improper use of a medical manual as evidence. The judge also ordered a new trial.  A second trial resulted in a verdict for Dr. Uribe.  On appeal by McDuffie, the Third District Court affirmed the judgment for Dr. Uribe.

NFL career statistics

Life after football
McDuffie hosts a weekly podcast, The Fish Tank: Dolphins Tales From The Deep as part of the Miami Dolphins Podcast Network. McDuffie and his co-host, Seth Levit, are joined by popular personalities connected to the Miami Dolphins, including current and former players, coaches, front office and team personnel as well as media members who have covered the team, sharing, "the best Miami Dolphins stories you never heard."

McDuffie was formerly a radio personality for WAXY, an AM sports radio station in South Florida and is now a sports blogger at OPENSports.com. He is also the founder and chairman of the Catch 81 Foundation, an organization created to raise money for children's charitable causes in the South Florida metropolitan area.

He was inducted into the Dolphins Walk of Fame on December 29, 2013.

In 2015, he was inducted into the Hawken School Athletic Hall of Fame.

References

External links
 "About O.J. McDuffie", on SportsTalk 790
 "McDuffie Biography", OPENSports.com
 McDuffie's McBlog, OPEN Sports Network
 Catch 81 Foundation
 O.J. McDuffie: My Five Most Memorable Games , The Finsiders, July 6, 2013

1969 births
Living people
All-American college football players
American bloggers
American columnists
American football wide receivers
American sports radio personalities
Journalists from Ohio
Miami Dolphins players
Penn State Nittany Lions football players
People from Marion, Ohio
Players of American football from Ohio
21st-century American non-fiction writers
Hawken School alumni
Ed Block Courage Award recipients